is a district located in Shimane Prefecture, Japan.

As of 2003, the district has an estimated population of 24,500 and a density of 70.79 people per km2. The total area is 346.10 km2.

The Oki District encompasses the Oki Islands, historically called Oki Province.

Towns and villages
Ama (Nakanoshima Island)
Chibu (Chiburijima Island)
Nishinoshima (Nishinoshima Island)
Okinoshima (Dōgo Island) - formed from the merger of Fuse, Goka, Saigō and Tsuma on October 1, 2004

Districts in Shimane Prefecture